The 2018 Kazakhstan Premier League was the 27th season of the Kazakhstan Premier League, the highest football league competition in Kazakhstan. Astana defended their championship, winning the Premier League for a fifth time.

Teams
FC Okzhetpes and FC Taraz were relegated at the end of the 2016 season, and were replaced by FC Zhetysu and FC Kyzylzhar.

Team overview

Personnel and kits

Note: Flags indicate national team as has been defined under FIFA eligibility rules. Players and Managers may hold more than one non-FIFA nationality.

Foreign players
The number of foreign players is restricted to eight per KPL team. A team can use only five foreign players on the field in each game.

In bold: Players that have been capped for their national team.

Managerial changes

Regular season

Table

Results

Games 1–22

Games 23–33

Relegation play-offs

Statistics

Scoring
 First goal of the season: Pavel Shabalin for Irtysh Pavlodar against Atyrau (11 March 2018)

Top scorers

Hat-tricks

References

External links
Official website 

Kazakhstan Premier League seasons
1
Kazakh
Kazakh